Otto Kirchner may refer to:
 Otto Kirchner (painter)
 Otto Kirchner (politician)
 Otto Kirchner (SS officer)